Malik Faridullah Khan Wazir (HI) (died 29 May 2005) was a Pakistani politician and former federal minister and member of the Senate of Pakistan.

Khan was assassinated on 29 May 2005, shortly after leaving Wana, the regional headquarters of South Waziristan, after attending a media briefing by Major General Niaz Khattak, GOC, Wana.

Awards and honors
 Hilal-i-Imtiaz – (2005)

References

2005 deaths
People from South Waziristan
Assassinated Pakistani politicians
Members of the Senate of Pakistan
Recipients of Hilal-i-Imtiaz
Place of birth missing
Date of birth missing
Year of birth missing